The 2004–05 season was the 73rd season in the existence of FC Metz and the club's second consecutive season in the top flight of French football. In addition to the domestic league, Metz participated in this season's edition of the Coupe de France and the Coupe de la Ligue. The season covered the period from 1 July 2004 to 30 June 2005.

Players
Squad at end of season

Left club during season

Pre-season and friendlies

Competitions

Overall record

Ligue 1

League table

Results summary

Results by round

Matches

Coupe de France

Coupe de la Ligue

Statistics

Goalscorers

Notes and references

Notes

References

FC Metz seasons
Metz